Jamsher Khurd  is a town and Union Council of Kasur District in the Punjab province of Pakistan. It is part of Chunian Tehsil and is located at 30°55'35N 74°4'10E with an altitude of 172 metres (567 feet).
Khurd and Kalan Persian language word which means small and Big respectively when two villages have same name then it is distinguished as Kalan means Big and Khurd means Small with Village Name.

Rural Dispensary Jamsher Khurd

The Rural Dispensary (RD) Jamsher Khurd is being run under the administration of Dr. Mian Afnan Sharif by Punjab Rural Support Program (PRSP) Kasur.  An average of 1500 patients are being treated every month.

References

Kasur District